TeleAsia was a Filipino entertainment cable channel based in the Philippines. TeleAsia brings Asianovela from Korea, Taiwan, China and the rest of Asia, as well as Pinoy remakes of Asianovelas. TeleAsia is owned by MyPinoy TV Broadband Inc. in partnership with Telesuccess Inc.

TeleAsia was available in 2 separate channels: TeleAsia Chinese (broadcast in Mandarin and Hokkien language) and TeleAsia Filipino (broadcast in Tagalog language).

TeleAsia Chinese was the second Chinese channel in the Philippines.

After almost 3 years of broadcasting, TeleAsia Filipino and TeleAsia Chinese ceased broadcasting on television effective September 17, 2015.

Programming
This is a list of general entertainment programs broadcast on the premium television channel TeleAsia Filipino and TeleAsia Chinese. All programmes listed below are dubbed in Filipino for Teleasia Filipino and in original Mandarin and Cantonese audio as well as dubbed in Mandarin and Hokkien with subtitles for TeleAsia Chinese as the channel is only broadcast in the Philippines.

Each program is listed with its most notable/original title with the channel's designation, year of airing and other notes in the parentheses.

Legend
*: First Philippine airing on the channel
+: First aired on different channel in the Philippines and dubbed in English

The Final Program Line-Up

TeleAsia Filipino
 Ako si Kim Samsoon
 All About Eve
 Amaya
 Ang Iibigin Ay Ikaw
 Ang Iibigin Ay Ikaw Pa Rin
 Atashin'chi (Season 2)
 Bad Woman, Good Woman (as "Good Wife, Bad Wife")
 Baki the Grappler
 Bakugan Battle Brawlers+
 Bakugan Battle Brawlers: New Vestroia+
Bakugan Battle Brawlers: Gundalian Invaders+
 Bakuman*
 Basketball Tribe
 Battle Spirits
 Becoming a Billionaire*
 Beethoven Virus
 Black and White
 Bride of the Century
 Cinderella Man
 Cinderella's Stepsister
 Coffee Prince
 Dong Yi
 Easy Fortune, Happy Life
 EZ Shop
 Flames of Desire
 Flower Boy Ramen Shop (as "Cool Guys, Hot Ramen")
 Fairy Tail (Season 1)
 Fated to Love You (Taiwanese version)
 Flame of Recca
 Full House
 Fushigi Yugi
 Giant
 Gokusen, Gokusen II and Gokusen III (live action)
 Glass Castle
 Good Job, Good Job (as "Cheer Up on Love")
 Hajime no Ippo (as "Knock Out")
 Hatsumei Boy Kanipan (as "Gadget Boy")
 High Kick!
 Heaven's Dragon*
 Heavenly Beauty*
 Hunter × Hunter (1999 TV series; 2002 OVA only)
 I Love You, Don't Cry (as "Don't Cry, My Love")
 Inuyasha: The Final Act
 Invincible Shan Bao Mei*
 Jewel in the Palace
 Kōtetsu Sangokushi*
 K-On!* and  K-On!!*
 Masked Rider 555
 Masked Rider Hibiki
 Kung Fu Soccer*
 The Legend
 The Legend of Bruce Lee
 Likeable or Not
 Love You a Thousand Times
 My Lovely Sam Soon (as "My Name is Kim Sam Soon")
 My Lucky Star
 Night After Night
 Pink Lipstick
 Powerpuff Girls Z
 The Prince of Tennis
 Queen of Reversals
 Queen Seon Deok
 Condor Romance (as "Love of the Condor Heroes")
 Rockman.EXE Axess
 Rockman.EXE Stream
 Rockman.EXE Beast
 Rockman.EXE Beast Plus*
 Queen of Housewives (as "My Wife is a Superwoman")
 S · A: Special A (as "Special A")
 Shaman King
 Shin Mazinger Z Impact (as "Shin Mazinger Edition Z")
 Smile Honey
 Shaider
 Starlit*
 Tactics
 TeleSine Weekend Specials
 Tenjho Tenge
 Three Brothers
 Time Between Dog and Wolf
 Tokyo Majin
 Unfrogettable Affection*
 What's for Dinner?
 White Lies
 Wife Returns (as "Return of the Wife")
 Yatterman (2008 version)
 Ying Ye 3 Jia 1 (as "Sakurano 3 + 1")
 YuYu Hakusho (as "Ghost Fighter")

TeleAsia Chinese
 A Man Called God*
 The Abandoned Secret*
 The Accidental Couple*
 All Men Are Brothers*
 Angel Lover*
 Beauty's Rival in Palace*
 Backkom*
 Billie Jean, Look at Me*
 The Birth of the Rich*
 Bride of the Century
 Bubble Carp
 Bull Fighting (as "Freestyle")
 Butterfly Romance*
 Cinderella Man
 Cinderella's Sister
 Condor Romance (as "Love of the Condor Heroes")
 Crimson Sabre  (as "Sword Stained with Royal Blood (2000)")
 The Deer and the Cauldron*
 Demi-Gods and Semi-Devils*
 Dr. Jin*
 Dong Yi
 Easy Fortune, Happy Life
 Eternal Love*
 Fated to Love You (Taiwanese version)
 First Wives' Club
 Flames of Desire
 Flower Boys Next Door*
 Flower Boy Ramen Shop* (as "Cool Guys, Hot Ramen")
 Giant
 Happy Noodle*
 Heaven's Dragon*
 Hero
 Hi My Sweetheart*
 Holding Hands*
 The Investiture of the Gods (2014)*
 Jewel in the Palace
 Invincible Shan Bao Mei*
 Kamen Rider OOO
 Knock Knock Loving You*
 Kung Fu Soccer*
 Laughing in the Wind*
 The Legend (as "Four Gods and a King")
 The Legend of Goddess Luo*
 The Little Fairy*
 Love Actually*
 Loving You a Thousand Times
 Madam White Snake*
 The Magic Blade*
 The Master of the House*
 May Queen*
 Mei Fong's Cooking Class*
 Meteor, Butterfly, Sword*
 Miss Rose*
 Mrs. Town*
 The Mu Saga*
 Music Bank* (2011 episodes only)
 My Lucky Star
 My Queen* (as "Queen of No Marriage")
 New Heavenly Sword and Dragon Sabre* (as "Dragon Sabre Yitian")
 Night After Night
 Pandamen*
 The Palace: The Last Daughter*
 Personal Taste* (as "Real Taste")
 Pink Lipstick
 Queen of Housewives (as "My Wife is a Superwoman")
 Queen of Reversals
 Smile Honey
 Snow City*
 Starlit*
 Swordsman*
 Time Between Dog and Wolf
 Unforgettable Affection*
 Vicky and Johnny Larva*
 The Virtuous Queen of Han*
 White Lies
 When It's At Night*
 Wife Returns* (as "Return of Wife")
 Wives*
 Yes No.1 Flavor*
 You Are My Destiny

References

External links
 Official website

Television networks in the Philippines
Defunct television networks in the Philippines
Television channels and stations established in 2012
Television channels and stations disestablished in 2015